Septeto Nacional (National Septet), or the Septeto Nacional de Ignacio Piñeiro, is a Cuban group credited with expanding the Son musical style before Arsenio Rodríguez. It added the trumpet to percussion, vocals, and strings. The group started as a sextet in 1927 in Central Havana. In 1929 it played at the World Exposition in Sevilla, and in 1933, it was invited to the "Century of Progress" World Exposition in Chicago. In the same year, Lázaro Herrera took over the group when Ignacio Piñeiro left it for financial reasons - despite their success the musicians earned very little. The group disbanded in 1937 but resumed playing for a recording session in 1940 and a television appearance in 1954. After the Cuban revolution of 1959, the group played again and is still playing. Its CD Poetas del Son was nominated for a grammy in 2004.

Discography
Sin Rumba No Hay Son (2010)
Desafiando al Destino
Poetas del Son
Clásicos del Son
Mas Cuba Libres
Havana Mood
Hecho en Cuba
Son Soneando
Imperdonables
50 Aniversario
El Son De Altura
Entre Preciosas Palmeras
Imperdonable
Lejana Campiña
Más Cuba Libres
Son de la Loma
Soneros De Cuba

External links

Cuban musical groups
Son cubano groups
Septets
Musical groups established in 1927